Wendy Albiston (born 13 January 1969) is a Welsh actress.

In 2002, she played De Chevreuse in the Doctor Who audio drama The Church and the Crown and guest starred in the Sarah Jane Smith adventure The TAO Connection.

She is probably best known for her role as Guard Miller in the 2006 British-Indian film Provoked and as Martha in the 2008 British television mini-series Sense and Sensibility. Most recently she played Baines the chauffeur in the BBC's The Turn of the Screw (2009). Albiston had small roles in the Bollywood film Jhootha Hi Sahi directed by Abbas Tyrewala and in Five Daughters the BBCs factually-based drama telling the stories of five young women who were murdered in Ipswich in 2006.

External links

Review of Romeo and Juliet

1969 births
Living people
Welsh voice actresses
Welsh television actresses
People from Pontypridd